Blackwater Airport  is an airport in Blackwater, Queensland, Australia.

As of 16 August 2010, all commercial services to and from Blackwater ceased operations due to poor patronage. QantasLink was the only scheduled operator at the time with daily flights to Brisbane, with some services operating via Emerald. However, the airport would remain open to emergency medical users such as the Royal Flying Doctor Service.

See also
 List of airports in Queensland

References

External links
 

Airports in Queensland
Buildings and structures in Central Queensland